Dendrobium angulatum is an epiphytic orchid native to Southeast Asia.

Description
The stem is 40–100 cm long and slender. The flowers are small, 1.0–1.2 cm long with white with pink lines on the lip. It flowers and fruits between April and July.

Distribution and habitat
The species grows on tree trunks in subtropical rain forests. It is found in Bangladesh, India (Assam),  Myanmar, southwestern Thailand, and Vietnam.

References 

angulatum
Epiphytic orchids